Felix Mendelssohn's Cello Sonata No. 1 in B-flat major, Op. 45 was composed in October 1838.

Structure

The work has three movements:

 Allegro vivace
 Andante (in G minor)
 Allegro assai

A typical performance of the sonata lasts 25 minutes.

External links

Chamber music by Felix Mendelssohn
Mendelssohn 01
1838 compositions
Compositions in B-flat major